This is a complete list of appearances by members of the professional playing squad of UE Lleida during the 1989–90 season.

1990
Lleida
Lleida
Lleida